Broughton railway station served the village of Broughton, Scottish Borders, Scotland from 1860 to 1950 on the Symington, Biggar and Broughton Railway and Talla Railway.

History 
The first site of the station opened on 6 November 1860 by the Symington, Biggar and Broughton Railway. It wasn't intended to be open for long due to the extension of the line being planned. It closed in 1864 and was replaced by a goods yard with two sidings and a goods shed. To the north was an abattoir which was connected to one of the sidings. The station was relocated to the south and rebuilt in the same year. A signal box opened 1891 at the west end of the westbound platform which was added later. The second station initially had only one platform but a second and a third were added in 1895. The station closed to passengers on 5 June 1950 but it remained open for goods. The line to the west closed in 1954 but the station remained open to serve the abattoir until 1966 when the line closed completely.

References

External links 

Disused railway stations in the Scottish Borders
Railway stations in Great Britain opened in 1860
Railway stations in Great Britain closed in 1950
1860 establishments in Scotland
1950 disestablishments in Scotland
Former Caledonian Railway stations